Leandro Cruz de Oliveira, (born 21 November 1982) is a Brazilian footballer who currently plays as a midfielder for Goytacaz.

Honours 
Goytacaz
 Campeonato Carioca Série B1: 2017

References

1982 births
Living people
Brazilian footballers
Brazilian expatriate footballers
Association football midfielders
Expatriate footballers in Vietnam
Expatriate footballers in Guatemala
Campeonato Brasileiro Série B players
Campeonato Brasileiro Série C players
Friburguense Atlético Clube players
Democrata Futebol Clube players
Guaratinguetá Futebol players
Sport Club Corinthians Paulista players
Esporte Clube Juventude players
Boavista Sport Club players
Duque de Caxias Futebol Clube players
Vila Nova Futebol Clube players
Navibank Sài Gòn FC players
Madureira Esporte Clube players
América Futebol Clube (Três Rios) players
Real Estelí F.C. players
Goytacaz Futebol Clube players
Footballers from Rio de Janeiro (city)